is the sixth installment in the Mario Party series of board game-style party video games by Nintendo and is the third game in the series made for the GameCube and was released in Japan on November 18, 2004; in North America on December 6, 2004; in Europe on March 18, 2005; and in Australia on September 15, 2005. It is the first GameCube game to make use of a microphone add-on.

Mario Party 6 received mixed reviews from critics, with praise for the day-and-night system, boards, and minigames, but was criticized for the microphone feature and its perceived lack of originality.

Mario Party 6 is followed by Mario Party Advance and Mario Party 7.

Gameplay

In Mario Party 6, up to 4 players take turns moving on board game-style stages, often playing multiplayer minigames to earn coins and stars. The object of the game is to amass the most coins and stars before completing a set number of turns. This is the first game to take out the coin bonus star, replacing it with the Orb star, which is awarded to the player that used the most Orbs. On multiplayer boards, the sun will periodically set or rise (every three turns), producing different effects. Changes include spaces moving, different characters appearing, and changes to minigames. This is reflected in two new characters, Brighton and Twila, representing the sun and moon respectively.

All 10 playable characters from Mario Party 5 return in this game: Mario, Luigi, Princess Peach, Princess Daisy, Wario, Waluigi, Toad, Yoshi, Koopa Kid, and Boo. Toadette is also playable as a newcomer. There are 82 minigames in total.

Brighton and Twila, the sun and the moon who watch over the world, argue over who is more popular, thus causing chaos. Mario suggests they collect as many Stars as they can to fill the Star Bank and end this madness, but eventually realize Bowser had started the fight in the first place.

This was the last game in the Mario Party series to have the autoplay capability in Party mode (where all players can be manually set to AI, thus enabling the game to "play itself" without any human player). Every Mario Party game after this will not allow there to be less than one active human player at any time, unless a code is used.

Orbs
Orbs are special items players can either collect on the board or buy with coins at the Orb Hut. They can be used in many ways to give a player an advantage, such as stealing coins from rivals, hampering a rival's progress, or quickly obtaining stars. In Mario Party 5, these were called capsules. Unlike in Mario Party 5, the player does not have to pay to use Orbs on his or herself and may find coins in Orbs. How Orbs are used is determined by the Orb's type. These are: Self, Space, Roadblock and Special. Roadblock type Orbs are one-use only and trigger when passed. Space type Orbs transform a space into a character space and only work if a rival lands on the space. If a player stops on their own character space, they gain five coins. Self type Orbs add buffs to the player that used them such as additional Dice Blocks. Special Orbs are used automatically to protect players' coins or stars from being stolen from Pink Boo and Chain Chomp, occurrences exclusive to certain boards.

Solo Mode
Solo Mode is where a single player embarks on a special single-row board with a set number of spaces to collect minigames. The player may also choose a teammate (for 2 vs 2 minigames). Also the player plays minigames with the computer-controlled Red, Green, and Blue Koopa Kids. The dice block for Solo Mode only has the numbers 1–6 on it, unlike Party Mode where the dice blocks have numbers ranging from 1–10. At the end of the board, there is an exclusive rare minigame space, where the player receives a rare minigame without needing to play it. If the player goes past the rare minigame space, they fall off the board and lose all of the minigames they have acquired. To win, the player must land on the rare minigame space, or quit (without getting a rare minigame).

Minigames
There are 82 minigames in Mario Party 6. No minigames from the previous installments of this series return. New to this edition are mic and rare minigames. In mic minigames, players must say words into the GameCube microphone to perform different actions. The majority of rare games are usually obtained by stopping on the space at the end of Solo Mode, although one is purchased in the Star Bank. The minigames are divided into 4-player, 1-vs.-3, 2-vs.-2, Battle, Duel, DK, Bowser, Mic and Rare.

Reception

The game received "average" reviews according to the review aggregation website Metacritic. GameSpot cited great family and multiplayer fun, but criticized the game for having the same ideas of older Mario Party games. IGN criticized the game's lack of originality and the microphone. In Japan, Famitsu gave it a score of 3 eights and a 7 for a total of 31 out of 40.

Retrospectively, the game has been called by some critics as one of the best games in the series, citing the day-and-night system as an innovation that sets Mario Party 6 apart from other games in the series.

Mario Party 6 sold 1.63 million copies, making it the worst-selling home console Mario Party game.

Notes

References

External links
  
 

2004 video games
GameCube games
GameCube-only games
GameCube microphone games
Microphone-controlled computer games
Mario Party
Party video games
Video games developed in Japan
Multiplayer and single-player video games

de:Mario Party#Mario Party 6